Sonosalpingography (SSG), also known as Sion test, is a diagnostic procedure primarily used for evaluating patency of fallopian tubes.  It was introduced as a screening procedure for infertility investigations. It is becoming more popular among practitioners due to absence of side effects.

Procedure
Under ultrasound scanning, a slow and deliberate injection of about 200 ml physiologic saline into the uterine cavity is accomplished via Foley catheter. An inflated bulb of the catheter prevents leakage of fluid outside uterine cavity. By visualizing the flow of saline along the tube and observing it as a shower at fimbrial end, tubal patency can be tested. Presence of free fluid in pouch of Douglas also confirms tubal patency.

Uses
 For detecting patency of fallopian tube
 Detection of submucous fibroid polyp 
 Detection of some intrauterine lesions
 Part of infertility investigations
 Investigation of amenorrhea, especially in Asherman's syndrome
 Investigating repeat pregnancy losses for uterine anomalies

Eponym
The term 'Sion test' was popularized by Gautam Allahbadia after the popular government hospital in Sion, Lokmanya Tilak Municipal General Hospital, locally known as 'Sion hospital', where he invented the test.

See also
 Gynecological ultrasound
 Hysterosalpingography

References

Infertility
Gynaecology